Travelogue is a 2002 double album by Canadian singer-songwriter Joni Mitchell featuring orchestral re-recordings of songs from throughout her career. It is her 18th studio album and is the follow-up to 2000's Both Sides Now which had a similar format. Upon release Mitchell announced that it would be her last album, but later recorded one further studio album.

Vince Mendoza composed the orchestral arrangements. He won a 2004 Grammy award for Best Instrumental Arrangement Accompanying Vocalist(s) for his arrangement of "Woodstock". As of 2007, the two-disc set had sold 72,000 copies in the US.

Track listing
All tracks composed by Joni Mitchell; except where indicated

Disc 1
 "Otis and Marlena" – 3:54
 "Amelia" – 6:48
 "You Dream Flat Tires" – 3:48
 "Love" (1 Corinthians 13) – 5:40
 "Woodstock" – 5:56
 "Slouching Toward Bethlehem" (Lyrics based on a poem by W. B. Yeats) - 7:11
 "Judgement of the Moon and Stars (Ludwig's Tune)" – 5:22
 "The Sire of Sorrow (Job's Sad Song)" – 7:09
 "For the Roses" – 7:28
 "Trouble Child" – 5:02
 "God Must Be a Boogie Man" – 3:56

Disc 2
 "Be Cool" – 5:09
 "Just Like This Train" – 5:04
 "Sex Kills" – 3:57
 "Refuge of the Roads" – 7:56
 "Hejira" – 6:47
 "Chinese Café / Unchained Melody" (Mitchell / Alex North, Hy Zaret) - 5:41
 "Cherokee Louise" – 6:00
 "The Dawntreader" – 5:38
 "The Last Time I Saw Richard" – 4:58
 "Borderline" – 6:23
 "The Circle Game" – 6:50

Personnel
Joni Mitchell – vocals, art direction, photography, painting
Larry Klein – bass, musical direction
Herbie Hancock, John Lenehan – piano
Billy Preston – Hammond B3 organ
Chuck Berghofer – acoustic double bass
Paulinho da Costa – percussion
Brian Blade – drums
Wayne Shorter, Phil Todd – soprano saxophone
Plas Johnson – tenor saxophone
Kenny Wheeler – flugelhorn
Gavyn Wright – orchestra leader
Vince Mendoza – conductor, arrangement
Kris Johnson - background vocals
Chris Laurence, David Ayre, Leon Bosch, Mary Scully, Patrick Lannigan, Simon Benson - bass
Dave Stewart - bass trombone
Gavin McNaughton, Julie Andrews, Robin O'Neill - bassoon
Anthony Pleeth, David Bucknall, David Daniels, Frank Schaefer, Helen Liebmann, Jonathan Tunnell, Martin Loveday, Paul Kegg, Robin Firman, Stephen Orton, Tony Lewis - cello
Andrew Busher, David Porter-Thomas, Donald Greig, Gerard O'Beirne, Graham Godfrey, Jeremy Birchall, Jeremy Rose, John Bowley, John Kingsley-Smith, Jonathan Arnold, Jonathan Rathbone, Lindsay Benson, Matthew Brook, Metro Voices, Michael Dore, Michael Pearn, Robert Evans, Robert Johnston, Robert Kearley, Simon Grant, Stephen Charlesworth - choir
Jenny O'Grady - choir conductor
David Fuest, Heather Nicholl, Nicholas Bucknall - clarinet
Richard Skinner - contrabassoon
Isobel Griffiths - orchestra contractor
Sue Bohling - cornet
Andrew Findon, Anna Noakes, Helen Keen - flute
Helen Tunstall, Hugh Webb, Skaila Kanga - harp
David Pyatt, John Pigneguy, Michael Thompson, Philip Eastop, Richard Berry, Richard Bissill, Richard Watkins, Simon Rayner - horn
Jacob Heringman - lute
Chris Cowie, John Anderson, Sue Bohling - oboe
Chris Baron, Frank Ricotti, Glyn Matthews, Steve Henderson, William Lockhart - percussion
Mike Hext, Pete Beachill, Peter Davies, Richard Edwards, Roger Harvey - trombone
Andy Crowley, Derek Watkins, John Barclay, Kenny Wheeler, Paul Archibald, Simon Gardner, Stuart Brooks - trumpet
Andy Crowley - c-trumpet
Owen Slade - tuba
Bob Smissem, Bruce White, Catherine Bradshaw, Donald McVay, Garfield Jackson, Gustav Clarkson, Justin Ward, Peter Lale, Philip Dukes, Rachel Bolt, Tim Grant, Zoe Lake - viola
Antonia Fuchs, Ben Cruft, Boguslaw Kostecki, Cathy Thompson, Chris Tombling, David Emanuel, David Woodcock, Dermot Crehan, Douglas Mackie, Elizabeth Edwards, Everton Nelson, Helen Hathorn, Jackie Shave, Jim McLeod, Jonathan Evans-Jones, Jonathan Rees, Jonathan Strange, Julian Leaper, Katherine Shave, Mark Berrow, Michael McMenemy, Patrick Kiernan, Paul Willey, Perry Montague-Mason, Peter Hanson, Rebecca Hirsch, Rita Manning, Simon Fischer, Warren Zielinski - violin
Technical
Geoff Foster, Helix Hadar - recording
Allen Sides - mixing
Cindi Peters, Dana Pilson - production coordination

References

2002 albums
Joni Mitchell albums
Albums arranged by Vince Mendoza
Albums produced by Larry Klein
Nonesuch Records albums